Clã is a Portuguese pop rock band of a mixed nature in terms of style, ranging from moments of pure balladry, through jazzy details, to enthusiastic pop songs.

Biography
The band was formed in November 1992 in the city of Porto, consisting of Hélder Gonçalves (guitar), Fernando Gonçalves, Manuela Azevedo (voice), Pedro Rito (bass), Miguel Ferreira (keyboards) and Pedro Biscaia (keyboards).

Their first album LusoQualquerCoisa was released in 1996. In 1997 they released the album Kazoo.

Their third record Lustro was released in 2000. With it they won the Blitz Awards for Best Female Vocal, Best National Band and Best National Album. Lustro was also released in France, and the band played in Paris, Bordeaux and Barcelona.

Interested in art as a whole, Clã were invited by Porto 2001 – Portuguese Capital of Culture - to compose and play live an original soundtrack for a classical silent movie. The band chose Murnau's Nosferatu (1922).

Rosa Carne, the fourth album, was considered by critics one of the most important albums of 2004. Vivo and the DVD Gordo Segredo were released in 2005. The band released their album Cintura in 2007.

They are known by these main singles: Pois É! (1996), Problema de Expressão (1997) and O Sopro do Coração (2000).

Discography

Studio albums
LusoQUALQUERcoisa (EMI, 1996)
Kazoo (EMI, 1997)
Lustro (EMI, 2000)
Rosa Carne (EMI, 2004)
Cintura (EMI, 2007)
Disco Voador (EMI, 2011)
Corrente (Warner, 2014)
Nura Pakhang (Eu e Tu) (2017) 
Fã (2017)
Véspera (2020)

Live albums
Afinidades (live with Sergio Godinho) (EMI, 2001)
Vivo (EMI, 2005) (2CD - live)

Video releases
Gordo Segredo (DVD) (EMI, 2005)

Singles
Pois É !
Novas Babilónias / Ver Uma Mulher
Ao Vivo na Antena 3 (EMI PROMO 16/97)
G.T.I. (Gentle, Tall & Intelligent)
Problema de Expressão
Sem Freio / I'm Free
Conta-me Histórias
Dançar na Corda Bamba
O Sopro do Coração
H2omem (with Arnaldo Antunes)
Espectáculo
Competência Para Amar
Tira A Teima
Sexto Andar
Embeiçados

References

External links
Official WebSite
Official Myspace profile
 Facebook

Portuguese musical groups
1992 establishments in Portugal
Musical groups established in 1992